The 2017 DStv Mzansi Viewers' Choice Awards ceremony was held on August 26, 2017 at Sandton Convention Centre, Johannesburg.  The awards honoured the year's achievements in television, music, sports, and comedy voted by viewers in South Africa.

Performances

Winners and nominees

Favourite Song of the Year
Prince Kaybee (featuring Lady Zamar) - "Charlotte"
 Musa (featuring Robbie Malinga) - "Mthande"
 Black Motion (featuring Nokwazi)- "iMali"
 Bhizer (featuring Busiswa, S.C Gorna and Bhepepe) - "Gobisiqolo"
 Okmalumkoolkat - "Gqi"

Favourite TV Presenter
Thembisa Mdoda
 Robert Marawa
 Pearl Modiadie
 Phat Joe
 Bonang Matheba
•Iminam Tatiya

Favourite Comedian
Summary
 Skhumba
Celeste Ntuli
Tumi Morake
 Mashabela

Favourite Rising Star
Sjava
 Amanda Black
 Zamani Mbatha
 Michelle Mosalakae
 Andile Phehlukwayo

Favourite Radio Personality
BA2CADA
 T-Bose
 Tbo Touch
 Anele Mdoda
 Sgqemeza

Favourite Actor
Themba Ndaba
 Ntokozo Dlamini
 Warren Masemola
 Siyabonga Thwala
 Sello Maake Ka-Ncube

Favourite Actress
Vatiswa Ndara
 Thuso Mbedu
 Masasa Mbangeni
 Lorcia Cooper
 Dawn Thandeka King

Favourite Music Artist/Group
Kwesta
 Lebo Sekgobela
 Black Motion 
 AKA
 Cassper Nyovest

Favourite DJ
Black Coffee
 DJ Zinhl & DJ Tira

 Prince Kaybee
 DJ Shimza
 DJ Tira

Favourite Sports Personality
Caster Semenya
 Wayde van Niekerk
 Kagiso Rabada
 Keagan Dolly
 Akani Simbine

Ultimate Viewers' Choice Award
Thembisa Mdoda

1Life Life Changer AwardMama' AnnaLifetime Achievement AwardHugh Masekela'''

References

South African television awards
South African music awards
2017 awards
2017 in South African television